Olivier Charles (born 12 July 1979) is a former France international rugby league footballer. He had a brief spell at the Catalans Dragons in the Super League, but was released due to off-field reasons.

References

1979 births
Living people
Catalans Dragons players
France national rugby league team players
French rugby league players
Rugby articles needing expert attention
Villeneuve Leopards players
Villefranche XIII Aveyron players